Lawachara National Park is a major national park and nature reserve in Bangladesh. The park is located at Kamalganj Upazila, Moulvibazar District in the northeastern region of the country. It is located within the  West Bhanugach Reserved Forest.

The land was declared a national park by the Bangladesh government on 7 July 1996 under the Wildlife Act of 1974.

Location

The terrain of Lawachara is undulating with scattered  hillocks. Locally known as tila, the hillocks are primarily composed of Upper Tertiary soft sandstone. The park is crossed by numerous sandy-bedded streams (locally known as Nallah), one of which is the Lawachara tributary, from which the park derived its name. The soil of Lawachara is alluvial brown sandy clay loam to clay loam dating from the Pliocene epoch. Shallow depressions filled with water (haor wetlands) are also a feature of the region as the low-lying areas are often subject to flooding.

The humidity is high throughout the year, and Lawachara experiences frequent rains with occasional cyclonic storms.

Biodiversity

Biological diversity in the Lawachara National Park consists of 460 species, of which 167 species are plants, 4 amphibian species, 6 reptile species, 246 bird species, 20 mammal species, and 17 insect species. One of this is the critically endangered western hoolock gibbons, of which only 62 individuals remain in the area.

Plant and animal

The forest of Lawachara is of a mixed type, with the understory usually composed of evergreens, including Quercus, Syzygium, Gmelina, Dillenia, Grewia, and Ficus. The upper canopy, meanwhile, is mainly composed of tall deciduous trees including Tectona, Artocarpus chaplasha, Tetrameles, Hopea odorata. Toona ciliata, and Pygenum. The original indigenous mixed tropical evergreen vegetation had been removed or replaced in the 1920s. It is now mostly secondary forest with small remnant areas of rich primary forest. In the undergrowth are bamboo groves of jai bansh (Bambusa burmanica) and muli bansh (Melocanna baccifera), as well as several fern species and other epiphytes.

159 plant species belonging to 123 genera and 60 families were studied in 2010. It includes 78 species of trees, 14 species of shrubs, 42 species of herbs, and 25 species of climbers. Ficus (fig trees) and Syzygium (brush cherries), each with 7 species, were the most diverse genera. Other notable genera include Terminalia, Dioscorea (yams), Artocarpus, Calamus (rattan palm), Piper (pepper vines), Alpinia, and Curcuma. Threatened indigenous plant species include Bridelia retusa, Zanthoxylum rhetsa, Alstonia scholaris, Phyllanthus emblica, Cassia fistula, Orexylum indicum, Semocarpus anacardium, and Garuga pinnata.

The western hoolock gibbon (Hoolock hoolock) is a higher primate found in india. It is one of the top 25 most endangered primates and one of the six non-human primate species found in Lawachara. In a census in 2007, only 62 individuals in 17 groups were found in Lawachara and in the greater West Bhanugach Reserved Forest. Yet this is the biggest surviving gibbon population in Bangladesh. The Lawachara population is considered of critical importance as it is likely to be the last viable population of western hoolock gibbons that will survive into the next century.

Human settlement
There are about eighteen villages near Lawachara. Two of them (Magurchara punji and Lawachara punji) are located within the boundaries of the park. Indigenous peoples in the area include the Christian Khasia people, the Hindu Tripuri people, the Tipra people, and the Monipuri people. The rest of the population are mostly Muslim migrants from Noakhali, Comilla, and Assam. There is a mosque located off Srimangal-Bhanugach Road called Lawachara Jame Mosque.

Registered forest villagers have certain rights within the reserve. This includes wood collection for fuel and building materials, hunting, betel leaf production, grazing of livestock, harvesting of other forest products, and limited agriculture in allocated land.

Chevron controversy
Seismic explorations
In 2008, the Bangladesh government permitted the US-based international Chevron Corporation (petroleum) to conduct a 3D seismic exploration in the Lawachara National Park. Chevron claims to give "utmost priority in protecting the biodiversity of the area". Field crews are instructed to avoid drilling shot holes near threatened plant species or areas of wildlife activity. Environmentalists, however, argued that the survey will have a long term adverse impact on the forest.

Environmental impacts
Explosions, conducted in Lawachara as a part of Chevron's survey, are claimed to frighten wildlife, making them leave the forest at an alarming rate. On 7 May 2008, a hoolock gibbon, in an attempt to flee, allegedly died after jumping onto an electric cable. Damage to residential buildings from the tremors induced by the explosions were also reported, as well as a fire caused by activities of the survey crew. Chevron failed to acknowledge both incidents.

Chevron's seismic exploration follows in the wake of the Magurchara gas field explosion on 14 June 1997, which destroyed  of the West Bhanugach Reserved Forest. Gas exploration in the area was then led by the Union Oil Company of California (Unocal), now a subsidiary of Chevron.

Responses
The survey has also been strongly criticised for violating the municipal laws of Bangladesh on wildlife conservation. It has been noted that the environmental impact monitoring team of the survey (including representatives from IUCN Bangladesh, the Bangladesh Environmental Lawyers Association, and the Nishorgo project), formed in response to public concern, were all funded by Chevron. Lawachara is also mostly maintained by the Nishorgo project, funded by the United States Agency for International Development (USAID). The Nishorgo project has been accused of being more concerned with international corporate economic interests by letting Chevron into the very areas they were supposed to protect.

Gallery

See also

 Bhawal National Park
 Satchari National Park
 List of protected areas of Bangladesh
 Madhupur tract
 Sangu Wildlife Sanctuary
 Para, Bangladesh – a village located within Lawachara National Park
 Punji – a village located within Lawachara National Park
 Sundarbans

References

External links

 Bangladesh drafts poachers to protect forest
 Lawachara National Park: Safe home for endangered animals
 Great Ape Conservation Fund
 Renewable Energy and Environmental Information Network (REEIN) webpage
 Sangu Wildlife Sanctuary
 Lawachara National Park: information and GPS trace of the 30 minutes jungle trail

National parks of Bangladesh
Forests of Bangladesh
Kamalganj Upazila
Protected areas established in 1996
1996 establishments in Bangladesh